This is a list of butterflies of the Federated States of Micronesia.

Hesperiidae

Coeliadinae
Badamia exclamationis  (Fabricius, 1775)

Papilionidae

Papilioninae
Papilio xuthus  Linnaeus, 1767

Pieridae

Coliadinae
Catopsilia pomona  (Fabricius, 1775) 
Catopsilia pyranthe pyranthe  (Linnaeus, 1758) 
Eurema hecabe marginata  (Kishida, 1933)

Pierinae
Appias ada ardens  (Butler, 1898)

Lycaenidae

Polyommatinae
Catopyrops keiria keiria  (Druce, 1891) 
Jamides bochus palauensis  (Fruhstorfer, 1915) 
Catochrysops panormus papuana  Tite, 1959
Lampides boeticus  (Linnaeus, 1767) 
Zizina labradus lampra  (Tite, 1969) 
Zizula hylax dampierensis  (Rothschild, 1915) 
Everes lacturnus pulchra  (Rothschild, 1915) 
Acytolepis puspa watasei  (Matsumura, 1915) 
Euchrysops cnejus cnidus  Waterhouse and Lyell, 1914

Nymphalidae

Danainae
Danaus affinis rubrica  (Fruhstorfer, 1907) 
Danaus plexippus plexippus  (Linnaeus, 1758) 
Euploea eunice kadu  (von Eschscholtz, 1821)

Satyrinae
Melanitis leda ponapensis  Mathew, 1889

Nymphalinae
Hypolimnas antilope anomala  (Wallace, 1869) 
Hypolimnas pithoeka pithoeka  Kirsch, 1877
Hypolimnas bolina nerina  (Fabricius, 1775) 
Hypolimnas misippus  (Linnaeus, 1764) 
Junonia villida villida  (Fabricius, 1787) 
Junonia orithya  (Linnaeus, 1758)

References
W.John Tennent: A checklist of the butterflies of Melanesia, Micronesia, Polynesia and some adjacent areas. Zootaxa 1178: 1-209 (21 Apr. 2006)

Lists of butterflies of Oceania
Lists of butterflies by location
Butterflies by country
Federated States of Micronesia
Butterflies